Emanation may refer to:
Emanation (chemistry), a dated name for the chemical element radon
Emanation From Below, a concept in Slavic religion
Emanation in the Eastern Orthodox Church, a belief found in Neoplatonism
Emanation of the state, a legal term for a public service body
Emanationism, an idea in the cosmology or cosmogony of certain religious or philosophical systems
"Emanations" (Star Trek: Voyager), a 1995 episode of Star Trek: Voyager
Emanations (Penderecki), a 1958 composition by Krzysztof Penderecki

See also
 Aeon (Gnosticism)
Emanate, a 1999 album by Penumbra